Ethinylestradiol/drospirenone (EE/DRSP), sold under the brand name Yasmin among others, is a combination of ethinylestradiol (EE), an estrogen, and drospirenone (DRSP), a progestin, antimineralocorticoid, and antiandrogen, which is used as a birth control pill to prevent pregnancy in women. It is also indicated for the treatment of moderate acne, premenstrual syndrome (PMS), premenstrual dysphoric disorder (PMDD), and dysmenorrhea (painful menstruation) in women. The medication is taken by mouth and contains 30 μg EE and 3 mg DRSP per tablet (brand names Yasmin, others) or 20 μg EE and 3 mg DRSP per tablet (brand names Yaz, Yasminelle, Nikki, others). A formulation with levomefolic acid (vitamin B9) has also been marketed (brand names Beyaz, Safyral, others), with similar indications. EE/DRSP is marketed widely throughout the world.

In 2020, it was the 145th most commonly prescribed medication in the United States, with more than 4million prescriptions.

See also
 Ethinylestradiol/drospirenone/levomefolic acid
 Ethinylestradiol/drospirenone/prasterone
 Estradiol/drospirenone
 List of combined sex-hormonal preparations § Estrogens and progestogens

References

External links
 

Combined oral contraceptives
Bayer brands